Noé Sow (born 18 December 1998) is a French professional footballer who plays as a defender for Pau.

Professional career 
On 26 June 2020, Sow signed his first professional contract with Pau FC. Sow made his professional debut with Pau in a 0-4 Ligue 2 loss to EA Guingamp on 30 July 2022.

Personal life 
Born in France, Sow is of Senegalese descent.

References

External links 

Ligue 2 Profile

Living people
1988 births
Ligue 2 players
Stade Brestois 29 players
Stade Plabennécois players
Pau FC players
People from Quimperlé
Association football defenders